Lalithasree is an Indian actress best known for her work in Malayalam cinema. She has acted in more than 450 films. She acts mainly in supporting roles. She is known for her comedy roles with Jagathy Sreekumar.

Personal life 

Lalithasree was born as Subhadra to Chandrasekharan Nair and Lakshmikuttiamma at Kottayam, Kerala. She has an elder sister, Mallika and a younger brother, Vidyasagar. Her father was from Kottayam and her mother was from Palakkad. Her father, who was a doctor, shifted to Vijayawada and the family settled there. She was studying at the seventh grade when her father died. They migrated to Madras after her father's death. She made her debut at the age of 15 in the Tamil movie Unarchigal. She discontinued her studies and since became busy with movies

Filmography

Tamil
 Devi Sri Karumari Amman (1974) 
 Unarchigal as (1975)
 Allaudinaum Arputha Vilakkum (1979) as Allaudin's chinnamma
 Marumagale Vazhga (1982) as Lakshmi's mother
 Kashmir Kadhali (1983)
 Thevar Magan (1992)
 Gopala Gopala (1996)

Kannada
 Jaga Mechida Huduga (1993)
 Ajantha (2012)

Telugu
Rudra Kali (1983)

Malayalam

 Aashanka (2020)
 Madhaveeyam (2019)
 Ajantha (2012)
 Highway Police (2006)
 Balram vs. Tharadas (2006) as Prisoner
 Thalamelam (2004) as Sarah 
 Mister Butler (2000)
 Asuravamsam (1997) as Vasumathy 
 Thirumanassu (1995) as Thankam 
 Vrudhanmare Sookshikkuka (1995)
 Hijack (1995) as Police
 Aavarthanam (1995)
 Bharanakoodam (1994)
 Gentleman Security (1994) as Alamelu
 Rudraksham (1994)
 Ponnuchami (1993)
 Golantharavartha (1993)
 Sthalathe Pradhana Payyans (1993) as Marukandam Madhavan's Wife 
 Ente Ponnuthampuraan (1992) as Servant
 Pramanikal (1992)
 Chuvapputhalam (1992)
 Snehasagaram  (1992)
 Naagam (1991)
 Aadhyamayi 
 Miss Stella 
 Kaumaara Swapnangal (1991)
 Apsarass 
 Swargathilekkoru Kurukkuvazhi (short film) 
 Raid (1991)
 Aswathy (1991) as Doctor
 Orutharam Randutharam Moonnutharam (1991) as Ammukutty
 Nayam Vyakthamakkunnu
 Niyamam Enthucheyyum (1990)
 Superstar (1990) as Chinnamma
 Vasavadatta  (1990) as Lalitha
 Judgement
 Anantha Vruthantham (1990)
 Minda Poochakku Kalyanam (1990) as Parukutty Amma
 Crime Branch (1989) as Mathilakam Kamalamma
 Chakkikotha Chankaran (1989)
 Antharjanam  (1989) as Gayathri
 Prabhaatham Chuvanna Theruvil (1989)
 My Dear Rosi
 Rathibhavam
 Maharajavu
 Aval Oru Sindhu 
 Janmasathru
 Theruvunarthaki 
 Unnikrishnante Adyathe Christmas (1988) as Subhadra 
 Thaala (1988) as Madhavi
 Inquilabinte Puthri (1988) as PC Ammaluvamma
 1921 (1988)
 Karate Girls (1988)
 Moonnam Mura (1988) as Panicker's wife
 Ajantha (1987)
 Dheeran (1987)
 Ponnu 
 Mangalya Charthu (1987) as Sumathi
 Naaradan Keralathil (1987)
 Naalkkavala (1987) as Madhavi
 Shyama (1986) as Sister 
 Vivaahithare Ithile (1986)
 Naale Njangalude Vivaaham (1986) as Superintendent
 Caberet Dancer (1986)
 Katturumbinum Kaathukuthu (1986)
 Love Story (1986) as Typing tutor
 Amme Bhagavathi (1986) as Alamelu
 Yuvajanotsavam (1986)
 Ninnishtam Ennishtam (1986)
 Ponnumkudathinum Pottu (1986) as Janu
 Veendum (1986) as Club lady
 Snehamulla Simham (1986) as Cameo
 Sakhavu
 Mazha Peyyunnu Maddalam Kottunnu (1986)
 Panchagni (1986) as Convict at jail 
 Niramulla Raavukal (1986)
 Nimishangal (1986) as Doctor
 Ente Entethu Mathram (1986) as Rudrani
 Annoru Raavil (1986)
 Aalorungi Arangorungi (1986) as Soshamma
 Pidikittapulli 
 Aayiram Kannukal (1986)
 Kayyum Thalayum Purathidaruthu (1985)
 Aarodum Parayaruthu (1985)
 Jeevante Jeevan (1985)
 Guerilla (1985)
 Onningu Vannenkil (1985) as Hostel warden, Dakshayini
 Vasanthasena (1985) as Victoria
 Muhoortham 11:30 (1985) as Sofia
 Vellarikkaappattanam (1985)
 Chorakku Chora (1985) as Thankamma
 Anubandham (1985) 
 Nerariyum Nerathu (1985) as Vimala Menon
 Kiratham (1985) as Mariya
 Akkare Ninnoru Maran as Pavithran's Mother
 Aattuvanchi Ulanjappol (1984)
 Aashamsakalode (1984)
 Idavelakku Shesham (1984) as Hostel warden
 Oru Kochu Swapnam (1984) as Sreedevi
 Kadamattathachan (1984) as Aleyamma
 Thathamme Poocha Poocha (1984)
 Koottinilamkili (1984) as Parvathyammal
 Ithirippoove Chuvannapoove (1984) as Ammukutty
 Kudumbam Enna Swargam Bhaarya Oru Devatha (1984)
 Vikadakavi (1984)
 Vellimohangal
 Adaminte Vaariyellu (1983) as Ponnamma 
 Varanmare Aavashyamundu (1983) as House Owner, Gomathiyamma
 Ee Yugam (1983) as Ammu 
 Asuran (1983)
 Manassoru Mahasamudram (1983) as Meenakshi
 Swapname Ninakku Nandi (1983) as Kaduthi Ponnamma
 Marmaram (1982) as Mrs. Sheshadri 
 Anuraagakkodathi (1982)
 Vidhichathum Kothichathum (Kasthoori) (1982)
 Komaram (1982)
 Mazhu (1982)
 Football (1982) as Professor
 Parankimala(1981) as Nani
 Cancerum Laingika Rogangalum 
Swarangal Swapnangal (1981) as Kalyani
 Mazhu (1982)
 Vida Parayum Munpe (1981) as Sudha's friend
 Ishtamanu Pakshe (1980)
 Ottapettavar 
 Nithyavasantham
 Lillipookkal 
 Kochuthampuratti
 Anyarude Bhoomi (1979)
 Allauddinum Albhutha Vilakkum  (1979)
 Kadathanaattu Maakkam (1978)
 Pocketadikkari (1978)
 Aalmarattam (1978)
 Seemanthini 
 Aparaajitha (1977)
 Aparadhi (1977)
 Neethipeedham (1977)
 Pallavi (1977)
Vidarunna Mottukal (1977) as Kamakshi
Madhuram Thirumadhuram (1976) as Nani
 Saptaswarangal (1974)
 Devi Karumariyammanri (1974)

Television
Hukka Huvva Mikkado (Kairali TV)
Kadamattathu Kathanar (Asianet) as "Durgamma"
Krishnakripasagaram (Amrita TV) as "Poothana"
Vikramadithyan (Asianet)
Paarijatham (Asianet)
Indumukhi Chandramathi (Surya TV)

TV Shows
 Veettamma
 Rani Maharani
 Innalathe Tharam

Dubbing
 Moonnu Masangalkku Mumpu (1986)
 Ente Sonia (1986)
 Abkari (1988) for Jayamalini
 Bhadrachitta (1989)
 Crime Branch (1989)
 Kaumaara Swapnangal (1991)
 Snehasagaram (1992) for Ragini
 Golantharavartha (1993)
 Kambolam (1994)
 Bharya (1994)
 Kalamasseriyil Kalyanayogam (1995)
 Kalyanji Aanandji (1995)
 Oru Mutham Manimutham (1997)
 Ikkerayanente Manasam (1997)
 Gloriya Fernandez From USA (1998)
 Thachiledathu Chundan (1999)
 Rapid Action Force (2000)
 Chenchayam (2000)
 Gaandharvarathri (2000)
 Nimishangal (2001)
 Driving License (2001)
 Moonam Yamam (2002)
 Melvilasom Seriyanu (2003)
 Veetla Vishesham (2022)- Tamil film for KPAC Lalitha

References

External links

Lalitha Sree at MSI
 Lest we forget at The Hindu (archived copy)
 Meet The Star at Malayalm Cinema (archived copy)

Actresses in Malayalam cinema
Actresses in Tamil cinema
Indian film actresses
Actresses from Vijayawada
20th-century Indian actresses
21st-century Indian actresses
Living people
Year of birth missing (living people)
Actresses in Telugu cinema
Actresses in Kannada cinema
Indian television actresses
Actresses in Malayalam television